The International Federation of Glassworkers was a global union federation bringing together trade unions representing workers in the glass industry.

History
The first international trade secretariat of glassworkers was established in 1892 at a conference in Fourmies, Nord.  Named the International Glass Workers' Union, its headquarters were at Castleford in England, and it was led by Alfred Greenwood.  It organised a second conference, in London, in 1894, but thereafter achieved little, and dissolved in 1900.

In 1908, a conference of glassworkers was held in Paris, to found a new secretariat.  This was located in Berlin until 1920, then moved to Paris.  One of the smaller international trade secretariats, by 1925 it had 11 affiliates, with a total of 93,000 members.  By 1935, it was moribund, and its remaining members joined the International Federation of Industrial Organisations and General Workers' Unions, which held its first glass industry sectional conference in Amsterdam in 1938.

Affiliates
As of 1922, the following unions were affiliated:

General Secretaries
1908: Emil Girbig
1921: Charles Delzant

References

Glass trade unions
Global union federations
Trade unions established in 1908
Trade unions disestablished in the 1930s